Lusławice  is a village in the administrative district of Gmina Zakliczyn, within Tarnów County, Lesser Poland Voivodeship, in southern Poland.

The village has a population of 920. 

Between 1976 and 2020 (his death), Polish composer, Krzysztof Penderecki resided in Lusławice in a restored manor house.

Tourist Attraction 
Penderecki established an annual international music festival there. He also established an arboretum in a 30-hectare park near his residence containing around 2000 taxa of trees and shrubs from all over the world. In 2013, he opened the European Music Centre in Lusławice - an international academy of music. The centre has 650-seat concert hall and a lecture hall for master classes and workshops. Penderecki Centre plays a vital part in cultural influence on the region of Małopolska.

History

The village is the site of the grave of Fausto Sozzini.

References

Villages in Tarnów County